The Independent Investigations Office (IIO) is the civilian oversight agency in British Columbia, Canada responsible for examining and investigating incidents involving on or off duty municipal police officers, Stl’atl’imx Tribal Police Service, Metro Vancouver Transit Police, Royal Canadian Mounted Police officers based in BC, Special Provincial Constables, Special Municipal Constables and Auxiliary Constables that result in death or serious harm.

History
The IIO was created in September 2012 under the BC Ministry of Justice in response to Braidwood Inquiry recommendations provided to the Government of BC by Justices Braidwood and Davies which indicated the need for an independent province-wide oversight agency to increase transparency and accountability of police oversight for the public. The agency is modeled after the Ontario Special Investigations Unit, the first civilian investigatory oversight agency in Canada. IIO is the 4th investigatory oversight agency of the police after the Special Investigations Unit, the Alberta Serious Incident Response Team and Nova Scotia's Serious Incident Response Team.

Organization
The agency is based in Surrey, British Columbia and is currently led by Chief Civilian Director Ron MacDonald. He succeeded the first Chief Civilian Director Richard Rosenthal, a former Los Angeles County Deputy District Attorney who was appointed to the position in January 2012, and resigned in September 2016 to pursue academic studies. The director of the IIO is a civilian position and the holder is required to have never served as a police officer. The agency itself consists of teams of investigators who may not have served as a police officer within the past five years. The Chief Civilian Director and each of the investigators are peace officers with the same powers as a police officer. Investigators without a criminal investigation background are trained at the Justice Institute of British Columbia.

IIO is a member of the Canadian Association for Civilian Oversight of Law Enforcement (CACOLE).

Mandate
Unlike the SIU or ASIRT, the IIO does not lay charges against those who may have committed an offence. In British Columbia, law enforcement agencies forward their investigative reports to Crown Counsel. If the charges meet the Charge Assessment Guidelines, Crown Counsel will approve the charges. Where Crown decides against approving charges against an IIO matter, a "clear statement" is issued by the BC Criminal Justice Branch outlining the reasons of not approving the charges.

Complaints that do not involve serious injury or death are not handled by the IIO. These complaints are referred to the appropriate oversight agency, such as the BC Office of the Police Complaint Commissioner, the Civilian Review and Complaints Commission for the RCMP or the Military Police Complaints Commission.

Notable investigations
 Killing of Merhdad Bayrami

References

External links
 Official website
 BC Ministry of Justice IIO Page

Civilian regulating boards
British Columbia government departments and agencies
Police oversight organizations
Government agencies established in 2012
Organizations based in British Columbia
Surrey, British Columbia